The 15th Pan American Games were held in Rio de Janeiro, Brazil from 13 July to 29 July 2007.

Results by events

Athletics
Arantxa King
Tyrone Smith
Deon Brangman

Bowling
Bobbie Ingham
Patrice Tucker
David Maycock
Kevin Swan

Diving
Katura Horton-Perinchief

Equestrian
Annabelle Collins on Medici (Dressage)
Jill Terceira on Navantus (Showjumping)
Patrick Nisbett on Antille 8 (Showjumping)

Swimming
Kiera Aitken
Roy-Allan Burch

Sailing
Malcolm Smith
Brett Wright
Katrina Williams
Stephen Dickinson
Leatrice Roman

Triathlon

Women's Competition
Flora Duffy
 2:03:13.92 — 12th place

See also
 Bermuda at the 2008 Summer Olympics

References
Bermuda Olympic Committee

Nations at the 2007 Pan American Games
P
2007